The Communist Party of Slovakia (KSS) was a communist party in Slovakia. It was formed in May 1939, when the Slovak Republic was created, as the Slovak branches of the Communist Party of Czechoslovakia (KSČ) were separated from the mother party. When Czechoslovakia was again established as a unified state, the KSS was still a separate party for a while (1945–1948). On 29 September 1948, it was reunited with the KSČ and continued to exist as an "organizational territorial unit of the KSČ on the territory of Slovakia". Its main organ (and thus the main newspaper in Slovakia at the time) was Pravda.

After the merger KSS functioned as a regional affiliate of the KSČ, not as an independent political institution. Therefore, the organizational structure of the KSS mirrored that of the KSČ: the KSS Congress held session for several days every five years (and just before the KSČ's Congress), selecting its Central Committee members and candidate members, who in turn selected a Presidium, a Secretariat, and a First Secretary (i.e. party leader).

The most important first secretaries were Alexander Dubček (1963–1968) and Jozef Lenárt (1970–1988). Following the March 1986 party congress, the KSS Presidium consisted of 11 members; the Secretariat included, in addition to Lenárt, three secretaries and two members; and the Central Committee comprised 95 full members and 36 candidate members. The KSS in 1986 also had its own Central Control and Auditing Commission, four other commissions, twelve party departments, and one training facility.

KSS ceased to exist in 1990 (following the Velvet Revolution), when it was transformed into the independent social-democratic party called the Party of Democratic Left (SDĽ). Most of that party, in turn, is now part of Direction – Social Democracy, which had separated from the SDĽ in 2000.

A new Communist Party of Slovakia was, however, founded in 1992 from a merger of the Communist Party of Slovakia – 91 and Communist League of Slovakia.

Leaders

Party leaders (1944–1990)
1944–1945: Karol Šmidke
1945–1951: Štefan Bašťovanský
1951–1953: Viliam Široký
1953–1963: Karol Bacílek
1963–1968: Alexander Dubček
1968: Vasiľ Biľak
1968–1969: Gustáv Husák
1969–1970: Štefan Sádovský
1970–1988: Jozef Lenárt
1988–1990: Ignác Janák

Prime Ministers of the Slovak Socialist Republic (1969–1990)
1969: Štefan Sádovský
1969–1988: Peter Colotka
1988–1989: Ivan Knotek
1989: Pavol Hrivnák
1989–1990: Milan Čič

See also
Communist Party of Bohemia and Moravia
Communist Party of Slovakia – 91
Communist Party of Slovakia
Slovak Socialist Republic
Central National Revolutionary Committee

1939 establishments in Slovakia
1990 disestablishments in Slovakia
Slovakia
Communist parties in Slovakia
Communist Party of Czechoslovakia
Defunct political parties in Slovakia
Parties of one-party systems
Political parties in Czechoslovakia
Political parties disestablished in 1990
Political parties established in 1939
Direction – Social Democracy